The NRL Rookie is an Australian National Rugby League reality television series that aired on 9Go!. The Rookies were coached by rugby league greats Brad "Freddy" Fittler, Mark Geyer and Adrian Lam. The winner of the show will be drafted to one of the 16 Australian National Rugby League (NRL) club's rookie list. The series was won by Lou Goodwin, who chose to be drafted to Canberra Raiders over the Gold Coast Titans.

Format

Captain Challenge

The Captain Challenges involves the rookies competing against each other in physical challenge of speed, endurance & strength each week. The rookie that comes first in the challenge will become weekly captain, they also cannot be cut from the competition during that week.

Game Day

All the rookies play as a football team to play a game of football each week. As they play the game, the 3 coaches will watch each rookie to assess the weakest from the strongest rookies and any improvements from previous weeks.

The Shed/The War Room

In The Shed, the rookies have a peer-to-peer session with psychologist Kate Baecher, as well as a group feedback session, this is where the rookies call out who they believe was weakest for the week & then vote for the bottom 3 rookies for The Cut.

In The War Room, the 3 coaches watch the session in The Shed on a television, this is where the give their final weekly assessment of each rookie.

The Cut

Every week, the rookies all stand on the field of Allianz Stadium as Freddy calls out the 3 weakest rookies of the week. The Captain Challenge winner has the option to swap a rookie for another or keep the 3 same rookies, one of the rookies will be chosen as the weakest of the 3 and be cut from the competition.

The Rookies
Daniel Caprice had previously represented England in rugby sevens while Lou Goodwin, Jesse Shearer  and Jordan Martin had fathers who played first grade (Matt Goodwin, Dale Shearer and Paul Martin respectively).

Following the filming of the show, Luke Frixou, who had previously represented Cyprus in rugby union, was signed on a trial contract by the Salford Red Devils.

 
 Notes
 Matthew Johnstone was originally in the top 28 but didn't make it through to the top 14. After Matthew Gorman was injured prior to week 2's game, Johnstone was given a second chance in order to even out the teams for the match.
 Roydon was cut before the Captain's Challenge due to breaking curfew after a night out.
 Luke was cut at the end of the first half of Game Day due to his lack of proficient rugby league playing skills

Results Chart

 Notes
 Chris won the Captain Challenge for this week but since he was in the top four all of the rookies were up to be cut from the squad.

 Rookie was Captain Challenge Winner and had immunity for the week
 Rookie made Captain's Call
 Rookie returned to competition
 Rookie was placed in bottom three or four
 Rookie was put in bottom three or four by Captain
 Rookie was put in bottom three or four by Captain and Cut From Squad
 Rookie was Saved by Captain's Call 
 Rookie was Cut From Squad
 Rookie was Cut before the Final Cut
 Third Place
 Runner-up
 The NRL Rookie winner

Guests

Broadcast

Premiere Episodes

Encores
Each episode airs five times during the week on free to air television across the Nine Network and multichannel GO!

International

The series broadcasts internationally on Duke (NZ), Sky Sports (UK), NBCTV (PNG) & FijiTV (Fiji).

References

9Go! original programming
2010s Australian reality television series
2016 Australian television series debuts
Rugby league television shows
National Rugby League